In enzymology, a L-glutamate oxidase is an enzyme that catalyzes the chemical reaction

L-glutamate + O2 + H2O  2-oxoglutarate + NH3 + H2O2

The 3 substrates of this enzyme are L-glutamate, O2, and H2O, whereas its 3 products are 2-oxoglutarate, NH3, and H2O2.

This enzyme belongs to the family of oxidoreductases, specifically those acting on the CH-NH2 group of donors with oxygen as acceptor.  The systematic name of this enzyme class is L-glutamate:oxygen oxidoreductase (deaminating). Other names in common use include glutamate (acceptor) dehydrogenase, glutamate oxidase, glutamic acid oxidase, glutamic dehydrogenase (acceptor), and L-glutamic acid oxidase.  It employs one cofactor, FAD.

References

 

EC 1.4.3
Flavoproteins
Enzymes of unknown structure